Lodestar was an English experimental progressive rock band, formed in 1996 by Heitham Al-Sayed (lead vocalist), John Morgan (drums)  and "Haggis" (sound engineer) after they left Senser.

The band released two singles, and gigged across the UK in 1997, including a support slot at the London Astoria with Tool. The previous year, the group released their self-titled debut album on Ultimate Records.

Discography

Albums
Lodestar CD Album [TOPPCD049] (A&M 1996)
 "Another Day"
 "Salter's Ducks"
 "Wait A Minute"
 "Representative"
 "By Halves"
 "Better Late Than Never"
 "Aftertaste"
 "Worthwhile"
 "Soiled Blood"
 "Down In The Mud"
 "Iliac Crest"
Lodestar 12" Vinyl Album [TOPPLP049]
Same as above

Singles
"Another Day" CD [TOPP046CD] (1996)
 "Another Day"
 "All You Need"
 "11/8 Koroviev"
"Another Day" 7" Vinyl [TOPP046] (1996)
 "Another Day"
 "Force Of Habit"
"Another Day" 12" Vinyl [TOPP046T] (Ultimate Records 1996)
 "Another Day"
 "All You Need"
 "11/8 Koroviev"
"Down in the Mud" CD [FEZ001CD] (A&M 1997)
"Down In The Mud"
"Neat, Neat, Neat"
"Down In The Mud" (Primitive Edit)
"Horse"
"Down in the Mud" 7" Vinyl [FEZ001] (1997)
 "Down In The Mud"
 "Somnopolis"

Promos
"Another Day" CD (1996)
 "Another Day"
 "All You Need"
 "11/8 Koroviev"
"Another Day" 12" Vinyl [UKPROMO8T] (1996)
 "Another Day"
 "Down In The Mud" (Primitive Edit)
"Down In The Mud" CD (1997)
 "Down In The Mud" (Radio Edit)
 "Down In The Mud" (Primitive Club Mix)
 "Salter's Ducks" (Alternate Mix)
 "Aftertaste"
 "Down In The Mud"
"Sampler" (Ultimate Records 1997)
"Down In The Mud" (Radio Edit) (3:38)
"Down In The Mud" (Primitive Club Mix) (4:19)
"Salter's Ducks" (Alternate Mix) (4:08)
"Aftertaste" (4:41)
"Down In The Mud" (4:16)

Members
 Heitham Al-Sayed (Vocals, 1996–1997)
 John Morgan (Drums, 1996–1997)
 "Haggis" (Bass, 1996–1997)
 Jules Hodgson (Guitar, 1996–1997)

References

External links
Ultimate Records

English rock music groups
Musical groups established in 1996
Musical groups disestablished in 1997